District 52 of the Oregon House of Representatives is one of 60 House legislative districts in the state of Oregon. As of 2013, the boundary for the district includes all of Hood River County and portions of Clackamas and Multnomah counties. The current representative for the district is Democrat Anna Williams of Hood River.

Election results
District boundaries have changed over time; therefore, representatives before 2013 may not represent the same constituency as today. General election results from 1990 to present are as follows:

See also
 Oregon Legislative Assembly
 Oregon House of Representatives

References

External links
 Oregon House of Representatives Official site
 Oregon Secretary of State: Redistricting Reform Task Force

Oregon House of Representatives districts
Clackamas County, Oregon
Hood River County, Oregon
Multnomah County, Oregon